Crime After School may refer to:

 Crime After School (1959 film), a West German drama film
 Crime After School (1975 film), a West German-Hungarian crime drama film